Fazao Malfakassa National Park is the largest of three national parks in Togo, the others being Kéran and Fosse aux Lions. It is situated between the Kara Region and Centrale Region in semi-mountainous wetland, and forms part of the border with Ghana. The Fondation Franz Weber was authorized by the government to manage the park for 25 years, beginning in 1990 and ending in 2015.

It was established in 1975 by the merger of two reserve forests created in 1951: Fazao and Malfakassa. The Forest Classée Du Fazao contains most of the biodiversity of the forest, while visitors go hiking in the rocky hills of the Malfacassa Zone de Chasse. The terrain consists of "savanna woodland ... good stands of gallery forest ... , submontane forest and grass-covered hilltops."

The site is currently being considered for inclusion in the World Heritage list of sites with "outstanding universal value" to the world. This site was added to the UNESCO World Heritage Tentative List on January 8, 2002, in the Mixed (Cultural + Natural) category.

Fauna
In 1990, elephants were common in northeastern Togo. With the country in a state of upheaval in the early 1990s, poaching became a major problem. By 2007, the population had been reduced to a remnant in the park. The number of elephants in the park was estimated to be around 50 in 2003. The park is one of two sites in Togo in the CITES Monitoring of Illegal Killing of Elephants Program.

The total number of known bird species is 244, as of 2008, but there are likely many more.

Antelope species in the park, based on 1984 aerial surveys, include the:
 bushbuck
 Maxwell's duiker
 red-flanked duiker (est. 450)
 bay duiker
 yellow-backed duiker
 grey duiker (est. 450)
 waterbuck (est. 450)
 Buffon's kob (Kobus kob kob) (est. 3200)
 roan antelope (est. 200)
 western hartebeest (est. 100)
 oribi

References

National parks of Togo
Environment of Togo